Maroubra is an electoral district of the Legislative Assembly in the Australian state of New South Wales. It is currently represented by Michael Daley, former leader of the Labor Party,

Maroubra includes the suburbs of Banksmeadow, Botany, Chifley, Daceyville, Eastgardens, Hillsdale, Kingsford, La Perouse, Little Bay, Malabar, Maroubra, Maroubra Junction, Matraville, Pagewood, Phillip Bay, Port Botany and parts of Eastlakes.

History 
Maroubra is one of four current electorates in the New South Wales Legislative Assembly to have been held by two Premiers of New South Wales while in office. Both Premiers Bob Heffron and Bob Carr have held Maroubra while in office, the other three electorates being Ku-ring-gai, Willoughby and Wollondilly.

Maroubra has always been a safe seat for the Labor Party. It has had one of the fewest turnover of members of current seats in the New South Wales Legislative Assembly, with just four members in over 60 years - equal with the electorates of Lake Macquarie and Wagga Wagga.

Members for Maroubra

Election results

References

Maroubra
Maroubra, New South Wales
1950 establishments in Australia
Maroubra